Colaranea verutum is a species of orb-weaver spider that is endemic to New Zealand.

Taxonomy 
Colaranea verutum was first described in 1887 by Arthur Urquhart as Epeira verutum, which had three subspecies, E.v. astatum, E.v. hastatum and E.v. lineola.

References 

Araneidae
Spiders described in 1887
Spiders of New Zealand